Pietikäinen is a Finnish surname. Notable people with the surname include:

Aatto Pietikäinen (1921–1966), Finnish ski jumper
Matti Pietikäinen (1927–1967), Finnish ski jumper, brother of Aatto
Matti Pietikäinen (academic), Finnish computer scientist
Sirpa Pietikäinen (1959-), Finnish politician

Finnish-language surnames